The history of Ottoman Bulgaria spans nearly 500 years, from the conquest by the Ottoman Empire of the smaller kingdoms emerging from the disintegrating Second Bulgarian Empire in the late 14th century, to the Liberation of Bulgaria in 1878. As a result of the Russo-Turkish War (1877–1878), the Principality of Bulgaria, a self-governing Ottoman vassal state that was functionally independent, was created. In 1885 the Ottoman autonomous province of Eastern Rumelia came under the control of and was unified with the Principality of Bulgaria. Bulgaria declared independence in 1908.

Administrative organization

The Ottomans reorganised the Bulgarian territories, dividing them into several vilayets, each ruled by a Sanjakbey or Subasi accountable to the Beylerbey. Significant parts of the conquered land were parcelled out to the Sultan's followers, who held it as benefices or fiefs (small timars, medium ziyamet and large hases) directly from him, or from the Beylerbeys. This category of land could not be sold or inherited, but reverted to the Sultan when the fiefholder died. The lands were organised as private possessions of the Sultan or Ottoman nobility, called "mülk", and also as an economic base for religious foundations, called vakιf, as well as other people. Bulgarians regularly paid multiple types of taxes, including a tithe ("yushur"), a capitation tax (jizyah), a land tax ("ispench"), a levy on commerce, and also various irregularly collected taxes, products and corvees ("avariz").

From the 14th century till the 19th century Sofia was an important administrative center in the Ottoman Empire. It became the capital of the beylerbeylik of Rumelia (Rumelia Eyalet), the province that administered the Ottoman lands in Europe (the Balkans), one of the two together with the beylerbeylik of Anatolia. It was the capital of the important Sanjak of Sofia as well, including the whole of Thrace with Plovdiv and Edirne, and part of Macedonia with Thessaloniki and Skopje. 

The Danubian Vilayet was a first-level administrative division (vilayet) of the Ottoman Empire from 1864 to 1878 with capital Ruse. In the late 19th century it reportedly had an area of 34,120 square miles (88,400 km2) and was formed from the Vidin and Silistra along the Danube River, and later also included Niš and Sofia.

Religion

The Ottomans did not normally require the Christians to become Muslims. Nevertheless, there were many cases of individual or mass conversion, especially in the Rhodopes. According to Thomas Walker Arnold, Islam was not spread by force in the areas under the control of the Ottoman Sultan. A 17th-century author said: Meanwhile he (the Turk) wins (converts) by craft more than by force, and snatches away Christ by fraud out of the hearts of men.  For the Turk, it is true, at the present time compels no country by violence to apostatise; but he uses other means whereby imperceptibly he roots out Christianity...

Non-Muslims did not serve in the Sultan's army. The exception to this were some groups of the population with specific statute, usually used for auxiliary or rear services, and the infamous blood tax (кръвен данък), also known as devşirme, whereby every fifth young boy was taken to be trained as a warrior of the Empire. These boys went through harsh religious and military training that turned them into an elite corps subservient to the Sultan. These corps were called Janissaries (yeni çeri or "new soldier") and were an elite and loyal unit of the Ottoman army. Recruits were rarely gained through voluntarily accessions, as some parents were often eager to have their children enroll in the Janissary service that ensured them a successful career and comfort.

First revolts and the Great Powers

While the Ottomans were ascendant, there was overt opposition to their rule. The first revolt began at the time Holy Roman Emperor Sigismund established the chivalric Order of the Dragon, 1408, when two Bulgarian nobles, Konstantin and Fruzhin, liberated some regions for several years. The earliest evidence of continued local resistance dates from before 1450. Radik (alternatively Radich) was recognised by the Ottomans as a voyvoda of the Sofia region in 1413, but later he turned against them and is regarded as the first hayduk in Bulgarian history. More than a century later, two Tarnovo uprisings occurred - in 1598 (First Tarnovo Uprising) and 1686 (Second Tarnovo Uprising) around the old capital Tarnovo. Those were followed by the Catholic Chiprovtsi Uprising in 1688 and insurrection in Macedonia led by Karposh in 1689, both provoked by the Austrians as part of their long war with the Ottomans. All of the uprisings were unsuccessful and were drowned in blood. Most of them resulted in massive waves of exiles, often numbering hundreds of thousands. In 1739 the Treaty of Belgrade between Austrian empire and the Ottoman Empire ended Austrian interest in the Balkans for a century. But by the 18th century the rising power of Russia was making itself felt in the area. The Russians, as fellow Orthodox Slavs, could appeal to the Bulgarians in a way that the Austrians could not. The Treaty of Küçük Kaynarca of 1774 gave Russia the right to interfere in Ottoman affairs to protect the Sultan's Christian subjects.

Bulgarian National Awakening and Revival

The Bulgarian National Revival was a period of socio-economic development and national integration among Bulgarians under Ottoman rule. It is commonly accepted to have started with the historical book, Istoriya Slavyanobolgarskaya, written in 1762 by Paisius, a Bulgarian monk of the Hilandar monastery at Mount Athos, lead to the National awakening of Bulgaria and the modern Bulgarian nationalism, and lasted until the Liberation of Bulgaria in 1878 as a result of the Russo-Turkish War of 1877-78.

The Millet system was a set of confessional communities in the Ottoman Empire. It referred to the separate legal courts pertaining to "personal law" under which religious communities were allowed to rule themselves under their own system. The Sultan regarded the Ecumenical Patriarch of the Constantinople Patriarchate as the leader of the Orthodox Christian peoples of his empire. After the Ottoman Tanzimat (1839–76) reforms, Nationalism arose in the Empire and the term was used for legally protected religious minority groups, similar to the way other countries use the word nation. New millets were created in 1860 and 1870.

The Bulgarian Exarchate (a de facto autocephalous Orthodox church) was created as separate Bulgarian diocese based on voted ethnic identity.

The foundation of the Exarchate was the direct result of the struggle of the Bulgarian Orthodox population against the domination of the Greek Patriarchate of Constantinople in the 1850s and 1860s. In 1872, the Patriarchate accused the Exarchate that it introduced ethno-national characteristics in the religious organization of the Orthodox Church, and the secession from the Patriarchate was officially condemned by the Council in Constantinople in September 1872 as schismatic. Nevertheless, Bulgarian religious leaders continued to extend the borders of the Exarchate in the Ottoman Empire by conducting plebiscites in areas contested by both Churches.

In this way, in the struggle for recognition of a separate Church, the modern Bulgarian nation was created under the name Bulgar Millet.

Also the Bulgarian Uniat Church was created.

Armed resistance to the Ottoman rule escalated in the third quarter of the 19th century and reached its climax with the April Uprising of 1876 that covered part of the ethnically Bulgarian territories of the empire.  The uprising, provoked the Constantinople Conference (1876-1877), and along with the strategic interests of Russia on the Balkans, was a reason for the Russo-Turkish War of 1877-1878 that ended with the reestablishment of independent Bulgarians state in 1878, albeit under the Treaty of Berlin Bulgarians were divided, and the territory of the Principality of Bulgaria was far smaller than what Bulgarians had hoped for and what was originally proposed in the Treaty of San Stefano.

Gallery

See also
Bulgarian Exarchate
Ottoman Vardar Macedonia
Russo-Turkish War of 1877–1878
Treaty of San Stefano

Footnotes

References
 DEVŞİRME USULÜ - ACEMİ OĞLANLAR OCAĞI MÜESSESESİ - article about devshirme method (in Turkish)
 "Dervisirme" in "Encyclopaedia of the Orient"
 website on the Ottoman Empire - original German version; here its Janissary page
 Papoulia, B.D., Ursprung und Wesen der “knabenlese” im Osmanischen Reich. München, 1963 (in German, title means 'origin and nature of the 'boy harvest' in the Ottoman Empire)
 A Guide to Ottoman Bulgaria by Dimana Trankova, Anthony Georgieff and Professor Hristo Matanov; published by Vagabond Media, Sofia, 2011

External links

Islam in Bulgaria
 
2nd millennium in Bulgaria
Ottoman Empire